Fantini is an Italian surname. Notable people with the surname include:

Alessandro Fantini (1932–1961), Italian cyclist
Corrado Fantini (born 1967), Italian shot putter
Girolamo Fantini (1600–1675?), Italian trumpet player and composer
Enrico Fantini (born 1976), Italian footballer
Marco Fantini (born 1965), Italian artist
Nicholas Fantini (born 1984), real name of Italian rapper Egreen

Italian-language surnames